Here is the list of Marthoma Syrian Churches in United States of America
 St. Stephen's Mar Thoma Church, East Brunswick, New Jersey
 Mar Thoma Church, Philadelphia, Fort Washington, Pennsylvania
 Christos Mar Thomas Church, Philadelphia, Pennsylvania
 Detroit Mar Thoma Church, Southfield, Michigan
 Chicago Mar Thoma Church, Chicago
 St. Thomas Mar Thoma Church, Chicago, Chicago
 Immanuel Mar Thoma Church, Virginia, Virginia
 Mar Thoma Church of Dallas, Farmers Branch, Dallas, Texas
 Sehion Mar Thoma Church of Dallas, Plano, Dallas, Texas
 Trinity Mar Thoma Church Houston, Houston, Texas
 St. Mark's Mar Thoma Church, Tampa, Tampa, Florida
 Mar Thoma Church of San Francisco, San Francisco, California
Mar Thoma Church of Greater Seattle, Kent, Washington

Mar Thoma Syrian Church